Omus submetallicus, known generally as the lustrous night-stalking tiger beetle or Smith's brome, is a species of tiger beetle in the family Carabidae. It is found in North America.

Subspecies
These two subspecies belong to the species Omus submetallicus:
 Omus submetallicus niger Horn, 1868
 Omus submetallicus submetallicus

References

Further reading

 

Cicindelidae
Articles created by Qbugbot
Beetles described in 1869